Mount James is located in the Lewis Range, Glacier National Park in the U.S. state of Montana.

Geology

Like the mountains in Glacier National Park, Mt. James is composed of sedimentary rock laid down during the Precambrian to Jurassic periods.

Climate

Based on the Köppen climate classification, Mt. James is located in an alpine subarctic climate zone characterized by long, usually very cold winters, and short, cool to mild summers. Temperatures can drop below −10 °F with wind chill factors below −30 °F.

See also
 List of mountains and mountain ranges of Glacier National Park (U.S.)

References

External links
 Flickr photo: Mount James
 Mount James weather: Mountain Forecast

Mountains of Glacier County, Montana
Mountains of Glacier National Park (U.S.)
Lewis Range
Mountains of Montana